Antoni Mężydło  (born 23 August 1954 in Lubawa) is a Polish politician. He was elected to the Sejm on October 21, 2007, receiving 42,052 votes in the 5 Toruń district, running on the Civic Platform list. He is active in the Central European Initiative.

He is included in the lists of Sejm 2001–2005 and Sejm 2005–2007.

See also
List of Sejm members (2005–2007)

External links
Antoni Mężydło - parliamentary page - includes declarations of interest, voting record, and transcripts of speeches.

Members of the Polish Sejm 2001–2005
Members of the Polish Sejm 2005–2007
Members of the Polish Sejm 2007–2011
Members of the Polish Sejm 2011–2015
Members of the Polish Sejm 2015–2019
Law and Justice politicians
Civic Platform politicians
Movement for Reconstruction of Poland politicians
People from Lubawa
1954 births
Living people
Members of the Senate of Poland 2019–2023